Kyzyl-Suu is a village in the Kemin District of Chüy Region of Kyrgyzstan. Its population was 1,478 in 2021.

References 

Populated places in Chüy Region